Nani is an Indian actor, producer and television presenter who works predominantly in Telugu cinema and appears in a few Tamil language films. He made his acting debut with Mohana Krishna Indraganti 2008 comedy film Ashta Chamma, an Indian adaptation of Oscar Wilde play The Importance of Being Earnest. After Ashta Chamma commercial success, Nani played the lead roles in three Telugu films in the next two years: Ride (2009), Snehituda... (2009) and Bheemili Kabaddi Jattu (2010). In 2011, Nani collaborated with B. V. Nandini Reddy on the romantic comedy film Ala Modalaindi which was profitable. The same year, he made his Tamil cinema debut with Anjana Ali Khan's Veppam, a crime drama set in the backdrop of North Chennai. The following year, Nani collaborated with S. S. Rajamouli and Gautham Vasudev Menon on the Telugu-Tamil bilingual Eega and the romance film Yeto Vellipoyindhi Manasu respectively. The former, which was about a murdered man reincarnating as a housefly and avenging his death, earned Nani an award in the Best Hero category at the 2013 Toronto After Dark Film Festival. He received the Nandi Award for Best Actor for his performance in Yeto Vellipoyindhi Manasu.

Nani ventured into film production in 2013 as a co-producer for the film D for Dopidi. He faced three box office failures in the upcoming years: Paisa (2013), Aaha Kalyanam (2014) and Janda Pai Kapiraju (2015). Nani termed it a "low phase" in his career and worked on the "planning of films and the timing of their release". He then played the lead role in Nag Ashwin Yevade Subramanyam (2015), a film focusing on a businessperson's journey to the Himalayas seeking self exploration. Nani later starred in Maruthi comedy film Bhale Bhale Magadivoy (2015), in which he played an absent minded scientist easily prone to distraction. It was the actor's first blockbuster success, and earned him the Critics Award for Best Actor – South at the 63rd Filmfare Awards South ceremony. With his subsequent releases, the profitable ventures Krishna Gaadi Veera Prema Gaadha (2016) and Gentleman (2016), he gained stardom in Telugu cinema. Nani later played the lead in the commercially successful Telugu films Majnu (2016), Nenu Local (2017) and Ninnu Kori (2017).  In 2018, Nani featured as the host of the second season of the Telugu game show Bigg Boss.

Film 

All films are in Telugu, unless otherwise noted.

Acting roles

Other roles

Producer

Television

Notes

References

External links 
 

Indian filmographies
Male actor filmographies